Warsaw station is a former train station in Warsaw, Indiana.

History
The station site was established as a depot by the Pittsburgh, Fort Wayne and Chicago Railway. The brick station building was constructed by the Pennsylvania Railroad in 1893. It was served by several of the railroad's named trains, including the Manhattan Limited and Admiral. Trains ceased to serve Warsaw by 1971 when Amtrak assumed most passenger operations in the United States.

On October 27, 1985, Amtrak added the station as a stop on their Broadway Limited and Capitol Limited lines. Services ended after November 11, 1990, when trains were rerouted further north.

References

Former Pennsylvania Railroad stations
Former Amtrak stations in Indiana
Railway stations in the United States opened in 1893
Railway stations in the United States opened in 1985
Railway stations closed in 1990
Transportation buildings and structures in Kosciusko County, Indiana